A disaster is a serious problem occurring over a short or long period of time that causes widespread human, material, economic or environmental loss which exceeds the ability of the affected community or society to cope using its own resources. Disasters are routinely divided into either "natural disasters" caused by natural hazards or "human-instigated disasters" caused from anthropogenic hazards. However, in modern times, the divide between natural, human-made and human-accelerated disasters is difficult to draw. 

Examples of natural hazards include avalanches, flooding, cold waves and heat waves, droughts, earthquakes, cyclones, landslides, lightning, tsunamis, volcanic activity, wildfires, and winter precipitation. Examples of anthropogenic hazards include criminality, civil disorder, terrorism, war, industrial hazards, engineering hazards, power outages, fire, hazards caused by transportation, and environmental hazards.

Developing countries suffer the greatest costs when a disaster hits – more than 95% of all deaths caused by hazards occur in developing countries, and losses due to natural hazards are 20 times greater (as a percentage of gross domestic product) in developing countries than in industrialized countries.

Etymology
The root of the word disaster ("bad star" in Greek) comes from an astrological sense of a calamity blamed on the position of planets.

Classification

Disasters are routinely divided into natural or human-made. However, in modern times, the divide between natural, man-made and man-accelerated disasters is quite difficult to draw. 

Complex disasters, where there is no single root cause, are more common in developing countries. A specific disaster may spawn a secondary disaster that increases the impact. A classic example is an earthquake that causes a tsunami, resulting in coastal flooding, resulting in damage to a nuclear power plant (such as the Fukushima nuclear disaster). Some manufactured disasters have been wrongly ascribed to nature, such as smog and acid rain.

Some researchers also differentiate between recurring events, such as seasonal flooding, and those considered unpredictable.

Natural disasters (caused by natural hazards)

Human-instigated disasters (caused by anthropogenic hazards)

Human-instigated disasters are the consequence of technological or human hazards. Examples include war, social unrest, stampedes, fires, transport accidents, industrial accidents, conflicts, oil spills, terrorist attacks, and nuclear explosions/nuclear radiation.

Other types of induced disasters include the more cosmic scenarios of catastrophic climate change, nuclear war, and bioterrorism.

One opinion argues that all disasters can be seen as human-made, due to human failure to introduce appropriate emergency management measures.

Famines may be caused locally by drought, flood, fire, or pestilence, but in modern times there is plenty of food globally, and sustained localized shortages are generally due to government mismanagement, violent conflict, or an economic system that does not distribute food where needed. Earthquakes are mainly hazardous because of human-created buildings and dams; avoiding earthquake-generated tsunamis and landslides is largely a matter of location.

Responses
The following table categorizes some disasters and notes first response initiatives.

See also

 Act of God
 Catastrophic failure
 Disaster convergence
 Disaster medicine
 Disaster recovery
 Disaster recovery and business continuity auditing
 Disaster recovery plan
 Disaster research
 Disaster response
 Emergency management
 Environmental emergency
 Human extinction
 List of accidents and disasters by death toll
 Lists of disasters
 List of man-made disasters in South Korea
 Opportunism
 Sociology of disaster

References

Further reading

 Barton, Allen H. Communities in Disaster: A Sociological Analysis of Collective Stress Situations, Doubleday, 1st edition 1969, ASIN: B0006BVVOW
 Susanna M. Hoffman, Susanna M. & Anthony Oliver-Smith, authors & editors. Catastrophe and Culture: The Anthropology of Disaster, School of American Research Press, 1st edition 2002, 
 Bankoff, Greg, Georg Frerks, Dorothea Hilhorst. Mapping Vulnerability: Disasters, Development and People, Routledge, 2004, 
 Alexander, David. Principles of Emergency planning and Management, Oxford University Press, 1 edition 2002, 
 Quarantelli, E. L. (2008). "Conventional Beliefs and Counterintuitive Realities". Conventional Beliefs and Counterintuitive Realities in Social Research: an international Quarterly of the social Sciences, Vol. 75 (3): 873–904.
 Paul, B. K et al. (2003). "Public Response to Tornado Warnings: a comparative Study of the 4 May 2003 Tornadoes in Kansas, Missouri and Tennessee". Quick Response Research Report, no 165, Natural Hazard Center, Universidad of Colorado
 Kahneman, D. y Tversky, A. (1984). "Choices, Values and frames". American Psychologist 39 (4): 341–350.
 Beck, U. (2006). Risk Society, towards a new modernity.  Buenos Aires, Paidos
 Aguirre, B. E & Quarantelli, E. H. (2008). "Phenomenology of Death Counts in Disasters: the invisible dead in the 9/11 WTC attack". International Journal of Mass Emergencies and Disasters. Vol. 26 (1): 19–39.
 Wilson, H. (2010). "Divine Sovereignty and The Global Climate Change debate". Essays in Philosophy. Vol. 11 (1): 1–7
 Uscher-Pines, L. (2009). "Health effects of Relocation following disasters: a systematic review of literature". Disasters. Vol. 33 (1): 1–22.
 Scheper-Hughes, N. (2005). "Katrina: the disaster and its doubles". Anthropology Today. Vol. 21 (6).
 Phillips, B. D. (2005). "Disaster as a Discipline: The Status of Emergency Management Education in the US". International Journal of Mass-Emergencies and Disasters. Vol. 23 (1): 111–140.
 Mileti, D. and Fitzpatrick, C. (1992). "The causal sequence of Risk communication in the Parkfield Earthquake Prediction experiment". Risk Analysis. Vol. 12: 393–400.
 Perkins, Jamey. "The Calamity of Disaster – Recognizing the possibilities, planning for the event, managing crisis and coping with the effects", Public Safety Degrees

External links

 List of Disasters at ReliefWeb of the United Nations Office for the Coordination of Humanitarian Affairs
 The Disaster Roundtable  of the National Academy of Sciences
 EM-DAT International Disaster Database of the Centre for Research on the Epidemiology of Disasters
 Global Disaster Alert and Coordination System – The Global Disaster Alert and Coordination System is a joint initiative of the United Nations Office for the Coordination of Humanitarian Affairs (OCHA) and the European Commission
 UN-SPIDER – UN-SPIDER, the United Nations Platform for Space-based Information for Disaster Management and Emergency Response], a project of the United Nations Office for Outer Space Affairs (UNOOSA)